Poison Pen is a 1939 British drama film directed by Paul L. Stein and starring Flora Robson, Reginald Tate and Ann Todd. It was based on the 1937 play of the same title by Richard Llewellyn.

Play
Written shortly before his famous novels How Green Was My Valley and None But the Lonely Heart, Llewellyn's play - concerning an outbreak of anonymous poison-pen letters that destabilise a small rural community - was first presented at Richmond, near London, on 9 August 1937. A West End production, using a revised text, opened at the Shaftesbury Theatre on 9 April 1938, moving to the Playhouse in July and the Garrick in August, achieving in all 176 performances and closing on 10 September. Theatre historian J. C. Trewin described the play, under the heading 'How Grim Was My Village', as "a showy bit of theatre."

Film
The film version was made by the Associated British Picture Corporation at their Elstree Studios and opened in London on 4 July 1939. Flora Robson and Reginald Tate inherited the leading roles played on stage by Margaret Yarde and Walter Fitzgerald. (Robson's character name - Phryne Rainrider in the play - was simplified to plain Mary Rider.) The only actor common to both play and film was Roddy Hughes. Novelist Graham Greene, at that time film critic of The Spectator, called it "a deplorable example of an English film which tries to create an English atmosphere." Latterly, however, it has been described by film historian David Quinlan as a "slow, sordid but striking dark drama" and by Raymond Durgnat as "a bleak story prefiguring Clouzot's Le Corbeau."

Plot
The calm of a peaceful English village is shattered when a series of anonymous letters starts being delivered to village homes, containing scurrilous allegations about the recipients and their families. Upstanding and respectable inhabitants find themselves and their loved ones accused in lascivious detail of all manner of moral, sexual and criminal misdeeds. The Reverend Rider (Tate) and his sister Mary (Robson) attempt to defuse the increasing consternation of the villagers by pointing out that the letters should be ignored as the malicious nonsense they are. Their efforts meet with little success, and Rider's daughter Ann (Todd) also becomes a target with lewd accusations being made about her fiancé David (Geoffrey Toone).

As the letters continue to arrive with ever more outlandish content, the social fabric of the village starts to fall apart. The letters all bear the local postmark, and people start to look suspiciously at their friends and neighbours, wondering who could be behind the campaign. Despite Rider's insistence that the contents of the letters should be disregarded, some notice that the letter-writer seems to have a very detailed knowledge of their personal circumstances, and start to question whether there may be a grain of truth in what is being written.  Personal relationships too come under strain.

Soon the entire village is overtaken by suspicion and paranoia, and fingers start to point at Connie Fateley (Catherine Lacey), a shy young seamstress who lives alone and does not tend to socialise. Convinced that hers is exactly the kind of personality that would find vent in a malicious poison-pen campaign, the villagers turn against Connie, openly accusing her of being the guilty party and ostracising her from village life.  Tragedy follows when the despairing Connie hangs herself from the bellrope in the village church.

Rider preaches a sermon in which he expresses his disgust with his congregation for having driven Connie to suicide without a shred of evidence against her. Most, however, believe privately that Connie's death was an admission of guilt and feel relief that the ordeal is over. But letters are soon arriving again and the police become involved, keeping watch on local letterboxes in an attempt to catch the culprit. David now starts to receive letters detailing Ann's alleged infidelity, and unstable villager Sam Hurrin (Robert Newton) is targeted with information that his wife Sucal (Belle Chrystall) is dallying behind his back with local shopkeeper Len Griffin (Edward Chapman). After drinking himself into a rage, Hurrin goes out to confront Griffin and shoots him fatally.

The police now begin a round-the-clock surveillance of all letterboxes in the village, the collected letters are analysed and everyone who has been recorded as posting a letter is required to provide the address on the envelope. A handwriting expert is also brought in. The investigations lead in a surprising direction, towards Mary, the vicar's sister and a respected community member who has managed to hide a severely disturbed mind behind a mask of caring efficiency. Realising that the net is finally closing in, the perpetrator descends into a destructive mental frenzy before fatally jumping from a cliff above a local quarry.

Cast

 Flora Robson as Mary Rider
 Reginald Tate as Reverend Rider
 Ann Todd as Ann Rider
 Robert Newton as Sam Hurrin
 Belle Chrystall as Sucal Hurrin
 Geoffrey Toone as David
 Catherine Lacey as Connie Fateley
 Edward Chapman as Len Griffin
 Edward Rigby as Badham
 Cyril Chamberlain as Peter Cashelton
 Athole Stewart as Colonel Cashelton

 Mary Hinton as Mrs Cashelton
 Wally Patch as Mr Suggs
 Ella Retford as Mrs Suggs
 Wilfrid Hyde-White as postman
 Esma Cannon as Mrs Warren
 Marjorie Rhodes as Mrs Scaife
 Beatrice Varley as Mrs Jenkins
 Roddy Hughes as graphologist
 Kenneth Connor as post office boy
 Megs Jenkins as barmaid
 Roddy McDowall as choirboy (uncredited)

References

External links 
 
 
 

1939 films
1939 drama films
British psychological drama films
Films directed by Paul L. Stein
British black-and-white films
Films shot at Associated British Studios
1930s English-language films
British films based on plays
1930s psychological drama films
Films set in England
1930s British films